The Electric Vehicle Association of America (EVAA) was established in 1910 to facilitate co-operation in improving the public understanding of electric vehicles. It was founded on the initiative of Arthur Williams. It existed as an independent organisation until 1916 when it was absorbed by the National Electric Light Association (NELA) of which it became the Electric Vehicle Section.

When Williams first proposed the project on 6 May 1910 to a group of engineers involved in the industry, the original conception was of an organisation local to New York, where Williams was based. However, when the matter was raised at the 1910 convention of NELA, at which it was decided that a national organisation was what was needed.

Presidents of the EVAA
 1910-1912 William H. Blood, Jr.
 1912-1913 Arthur Williams
 1913-1914 Frank W. Smith 
 1914-1915 John F. Gilchrist
 1915-1916 W. H. Johnson

Edward S. Mansfield, of the Boston Edison Company, became chairman of the Electrical Vehicle Section of the NELA.

References

Trade associations based in the United States